Phu Phan may refer to:
Amphoe Phu Phan, a district of Sakon Nakhon Province, northeast Thailand
Phu Phan Mountains, a range of hills dividing the Khorat Plateau of Thailand
Phu Phan National Park, a park in Sakon Nakhon Province